Nihonia maxima is a species of sea snail, a marine gastropod mollusk in the family Cochlespiridae.

Description
The length of the shell attains 128 mm.

Distribution
This species occurs in the Pacific Ocean off Eastern Indonesia.

References

 Sysoev, Alexander. Mollusca Gastropoda: new deep-water turrid gastropods (Conoidea) from eastern Indonesia. Muséum national d'Histoire naturelle, 1997.

External links
 Nihonia Holotype at the MNHN, Paris

maxima
Gastropods described in 1997